Pieter J. Botha (born 20 January 1998) is a South African rugby union player for the  in the Currie Cup and the  in the Rugby Challenge. His regular position is hooker.

He made his Currie Cup debut for the Golden Lions in July 2019, coming on as a replacement in their second match of the 2019 season against .

References

Alumni of Monument High School
South African rugby union players
Living people
1998 births
Rugby union hookers
Golden Lions players
Lions (United Rugby Championship) players